Martholme is a grade I listed medieval manor house standing on the banks of the River Calder  from Great Harwood, Lancashire, England  and  north-east of Blackburn.

History
In the 13th century, the house belonged to the de Fitton family. It was passed through marriage to the Hesketh family. Parts of the current building date from Medieval times. Additions and alterations took place in 1561, when the gatehouse was rebuilt and 1607.

The house was rebuilt in 1577 by Thomas Hesketh (d. 1588), High Sheriff of Lancashire for 1563. He added an east wing and a gatehouse. Later work was carried out during the time of his son Robert Hesketh (d. 1620), High Sheriff in 1599 and MP for Lancashire in 1597, who added a second arched gateway. After his death his last wife Jane married Sir Richard de Hoghton and left Martholme to be leased out to tenant farmers. With the death of Jane ownership passed to her son Thomas but the Heskeths never reoccupied the house itself.

After the Civil War the Hesketh family, as Catholics, were heavily fined, losing much of their land at Great Harwood. As a result, Martholme was neglected. It is now a private residence but much of the house has been demolished. It has been designated a Grade I listed building by English Heritage.

Architecture

Martholme is constructed, to a T-shaped floor plan, of sandstone rubble, now rendered, with a slate roof. It was originally surrounded by a moat, of which there are still traces.

It too is built of sandstone, with slate roofs. The entrance is a round stone archway. The building has three bays and is on two storeys.

English Heritage designated the house a Grade I listed building on 11 July 1966. The Grade I designation—the highest of the three grades—is for buildings "of exceptional interest, sometimes considered to be internationally important". The gatehouse has received a separate Grade II* designation.

See also
Grade I listed buildings in Lancashire
Listed buildings in Great Harwood

References
Footnotes

Bibliography

Further reading

Buildings and structures in Hyndburn
Country houses in Lancashire
Grade I listed buildings in Lancashire
Grade I listed houses
Great Harwood